Luis Daniel Wilson Ugarte is a Peruvian politician. He is a former Congressman, elected in the 2006 elections, representing the Cusco region for the 2006–2011 period. Wilson belongs to the Peruvian Aprista Party.

Biography 
He completed his primary studies at the 51027 Educational Center in his hometown and his secondary studies at Colegio Manco II and at Colegio La Salle in Cusco. He completed his university studies in Human Medicine at the National University of San Agustín. He has a Master's Degree in Public Health at the Universidad Peruana Cayetano Heredia. As a doctor he worked between 1990-2001 at the Quillabamba Hospital and since 2001 at the Antonio Lorena Hospital.

He participated in the regional elections of 2002 as candidate of the Aprista Party for the Regional Presidency of Cusco without success. He was affiliated from 2005 to 2010 to the Peruvian Aprista Party, being Secretary General La Convencion between 1992-1993 and Secretary General Cusco between 2005-2006. He was also elected provincial councilor of La Convencion between 1997-2001 and Congressman of the Republic 2006-2011.

He participated in the 2014 Cusco regional elections as a candidate for Regional President of the Popular Alliance made up of APRA and National Restoration, finishing third. In the 2018 regional elections, he participated as a candidate for Regional Governor for the political organization National Restoration , contesting the second round that he lost to the Popular Action candidate, Jean Paul Benavente.

References

Living people
Year of birth missing (living people)
Peruvian people of English descent
American Popular Revolutionary Alliance politicians
Members of the Congress of the Republic of Peru